How to Rap: The Art & Science of the Hip-Hop MC is a book on hip hop music and rapping by Paul Edwards. It is compiled from interviews with 104 notable rappers who provide insights into how they write and perform their lyrics.

How to Rap 2: Advanced Flow & Delivery Techniques is a sequel to the book, also on hip hop music and rapping by Paul Edwards. It includes more insights from the interviews done from the first book.

Publication 
How to Rap: The Art & Science of the Hip-Hop MC was published by Chicago Review Press on December 1, 2009 with a foreword by Kool G Rap. Publishers Weekly states that it “goes into everything from why rappers freestyle to the challenges of collaboration in hip-hop”, and Library Journal says, “instruction ranges over selecting topics and form, editing, rhyming techniques, putting words to music, collaborating, vocal techniques, studio tips, and performance”.

How to Rap 2: Advanced Flow & Delivery Techniques was also published by Chicago Review Press on September 1, 2013 with a foreword by Gift of Gab of Blackalicious. In the sequel, reviewers note that, "Edwards asks advanced wordsmiths for advice on rhythm, melody, pitch, timing, enunciation, percussion, playing characters, rhyme schemes, and rhyme patterns."

How to Rap is published in the UK by Random House on their Virgin Books imprint. This edition is also published by Random House in Australia. It was translated and published in Japanese by P-Vine Books in 2011 (part of P-Vine Records) and translated and published in Korean by Hans Media, also in 2011.

Artists interviewed 
The book is compiled from interviews with rappers; the interviews comprise the majority of the book's content. The following artists were interviewed by the author:

 2Mex of The Visionaries
 40 Cal. of The Diplomats
 Aesop Rock
 Akil The MC of Jurassic 5
 Akir
 AMG
 Andy Cat of Ugly Duckling
 AZ
 Big Daddy Kane
 Big Noyd
 Big Pooh of Little Brother
 Bishop Lamont
 Bobby Creekwater
 Bootie Brown of The Pharcyde
 B-Real of Cypress Hill
 Brother Ali
 Brother J of X-Clan
 Buckshot of Black Moon and Boot Camp Clik
 Cage
 Cappadonna of Wu-Tang Clan
 Cashis
 Chuck D of Public Enemy
 C-Murder
 Cormega
 KXNG Crooked of Slaughterhouse
 David Banner
 Del the Funky Homosapien of Hieroglyphics
 Devin The Dude
 DJ Quik
 Dray of Das EFX
 E-40
 El Da Sensei of Artifacts
 Esoteric of 7L & Esoteric
 Evidence of Dilated Peoples
 Fredro Starr of Onyx
 Gift Of Gab of Blackalicious and Quannum
 Glasses Malone
 Gorilla Zoe
 Guerilla Black
 Havoc of Mobb Deep
 Hell Rell of The Diplomats
 Ill Bill of Non Phixion and La Coka Nostra
 Imani of The Pharcyde
 Immortal Technique
 Joell Ortiz of Slaughterhouse
 Killah Priest (Wu-Tang Clan affiliate)
 Kool G Rap
 K-Os
 Lady Of Rage
 Lateef the Truthspeaker of Latyrx and Quannum
 Lord Jamar of Brand Nubian
 Masta Ace
 MC Serch of 3rd Bass
 MC Shan
 Mighty Casey (rapper)
 Mr. Lif
 Murs
 Myka 9 of Freestyle Fellowship
 Noreaga
 O.C. of Diggin' in the Crates Crew
 Omar Cruz
 One Be Lo of Binary Star
 Papoose
 Paris
 Pharoahe Monch of Organized Konfusion
 Phife Dawg of A Tribe Called Quest
 Pigeon John of Quannum and LA Symphony
 Planet Asia of Cali Agents
 Pusha T of Clipse
 Q-Tip of A Tribe Called Quest
 R.A. the Rugged Man
 Rah Digga 
 Rampage of Flipmode Squad
 RBX
 Remy Ma
 Rock of Heltah Skeltah and Boot Camp Clik
 Royce da 5'9" of Bad Meets Evil and Slaughterhouse
 Schoolly D
 Sean Price of Heltah Skeltah and Boot Camp Clik
 Sheek Louch of The LOX
 Shock G of Digital Underground
 Speech of Arrested Development
 Spider Loc
 Stat Quo
 Steele of Smif-n-Wessun and Boot Camp Clik
 Stressmatic of The Federation
 Styles P of The LOX
 T3 of Slum Village
 Tajai of Souls Of Mischief and Hieroglyphics
 Tash of Tha Alkaholiks
 Tech N9ne
 Termanology
 Thes One of People Under The Stairs
 Twista
 Vast Aire of Cannibal Ox
 Vinnie Paz of Jedi Mind Tricks
 Vursatyl of Lifesavas and Quannum
 Wildchild of Lootpack
 Wise Intelligent of Poor Righteous Teachers
 Wordsworth
 Yukmouth of The Luniz
 Zumbi of Zion I

It also includes information on other artists, who are commented on by the interviewed artists, including:

 Beastie Boys
 Big Pun
 Dr. Dre
 Eminem
 Jay-Z
 KRS-One
 Melle Mel of Grandmaster Flash & The Furious Five
 Nas
 The Notorious B.I.G.
 Rakim
 Snoop Dogg
 T.I.
 Tupac Shakur

Reception 
The book was positively received by critics and press outlets. Library Journal says it is, “filled with real tools and overflowing with inspiration… a good read even for nonartists interested in learning more about hip-hop creativity, personalities, and history, this offers insights into music and poetry. Highly recommended,”  Hip Hop Connection called it “a complete guide to the art and craft of the MC, anyone who's serious about becoming a rapper should read this first… a vital and vibrant expose of a much misunderstood art form,” and Campus Circle give it a “Grade: A+”.

XXL magazine said "over 100 rappers have offered their insight on the artform for aspiring wordsmiths", while Yale University Press's Anthology of Rap referred to How to Rap'''s "rich array of interviews with old school and new school artists," and Oxford University Press's How to Fix Copyright recommended How to Rap for a good "general" overview.

Dana Gioia, poet and former chairman of the National Endowment for the Arts wrote, “How To Rap marks a cultural coming-of-age for Hip-Hop… [it] is the first comprehensive poetics of this new literary form. …Edwards has made his bid to become the Aristotle of Hip-Hop poetics”.

It also received positive comments from hip-hop journalists and authors such as Kembrew McLeod, Dan LeRoy, Alex Ogg, Mickey Hess, Russell Potter, and Pancho McFarland, and from artists such as Georgia Anne Muldrow, Egon of Stones Throw Records, Badru Umi, and Speech of Arrested Development.

In a review of the Kanye West album Yeezus, news outlet The Daily Beast praised the book, saying: "In Paul Edwards’s comprehensive tome How to Rap, the author surveyed a plethora of rap emcees—104, to be exact—in order to demystify the rap process."

 Notes 

 References 

 Edwards, Paul (2009). How to Rap: The Art & Science of the Hip-Hop MC''. Chicago Review Press, .

External links 
 

Hip hop books
2009 non-fiction books
Chicago Review Press books